The Sanjak of Hamid (also Hamideli) was a second-level province (sanjak) of the Ottoman Empire. 

The sanjak comprised the region around the town of Isparta, which was ruled by the Hamidids, an autonomous Turkish dynasty that submitted to the Ottomans in 1390 or 1391/92. It became part of the Anatolia Eyalet, but was lost after the Battle of Ankara (1402) and not re-incorporated into the Ottoman state until 1423. After the Anatolia Eyalet was dissolved ca. 1841, it became part of the Karaman Eyalet. It was renamed after its capital as the Sanjak of Isparta in 1880, and again as the Sanjak of Hamidabad in 1891. In 1912 it comprised the districts (kazas) of Isparta proper, Uluborlu, Egridir, Karaağaç, and Yalvaç.

References

Sources 
 

Hamid
States and territories established in the 1390s
History of Isparta Province